Asprosin is a protein hormone produced by mammals in (white adipose) tissues that stimulates the liver to release glucose into the blood stream. Asprosin is encoded by the gene FBN1 as part of the protein profibrillin and is released from the C-terminus of the latter by specific proteolysis. In the liver, asprosin activates rapid glucose release via a cyclic adenosine monophosphate (cAMP)-dependent pathway.

Discovery 
Asprosin was first identified by Dr. Atul Chopra and coworkers at Baylor College of Medicine as a C-terminal cleavage product of the FBN1 gene product profibrillin. They found mutations in the FBN1 gene in two patients with congenital partial lipodystrophy and a progeroid appearance. The two patients were Lizzie Velasquez and Abby Solomon. Truncations of the FBN1 protein in these patients were seen to have two consequences for protein production: a mutant/truncated fibrillin protein and very low plasma asprosin levels (from a postulated dominant negative effect). The condition has since been named Marfanoid–progeroid–lipodystrophy syndrome or neonatal progeroid syndrome (NPS).

Profibrillin cleavage and asprosin secretion 
The asprosin mechanism begins with the cleavage of profibrillin. While the specific cellular location of profibrillin cleavage is largely unknown, it is speculated to occur between the trans-Golgi network and the cell surface, or upon fibrillin-1 secretion. Furin cleaves asprosin at the R-C-K/R-R motif in the C-terminal domain. This cleavage event is important because it is required for the incorporation of fibrillin-1 into the extracellular matrix. Since furin is expressed in a plethora of cell lines and tissues, the presence or lack of this enzyme does not narrow down the possible locations of asprosin secretion.

Evidence suggests that asprosin is secreted from white adipose tissue, which accounts for 5–50% of human body weight and is already known to secrete adipokines such as leptin and adiponectin. While FBN1 is expressed in many tissues, its highest expression in both humans and mice is in white adipose. However, since FBN1 (and thus, asprosin) is widely expressed in many human tissues, it is likely that white adipose is not the only source of plasma asprosin. There has been evidence connecting asprosin secretion from wild-type human dermal fibroblasts suggesting that it may be secreted from skin. It was also discovered that MIN6 pancreatic β-cells and human primary islets containing β-cells secrete asprosin and that secretion is induced by palmitate in a dose-dependent manner. Asprosin has also been detected in saliva samples.

Function 

Once in the circulation, asprosin targets the liver and the brain.

Function in liver 
The liver stores excess glucose in the form of glycogen after a meal, in response to insulin. Between meals (or during fasting), the liver is stimulated to break down this glycogen to release glucose (glycogenolysis) and also synthesizes new glucose (gluconeogenesis); this glucose is released into the bloodstream to maintain normal function of the brain and other organs that burn glucose for energy. Glycogenolysis and gluconeogenesis are stimulated by hormones such as glucagon that activate the cyclic AMP pathway in liver hepatocytes, and this cAMP promotes activation of metabolic enzymes leading to glucose production and release; asprosin appears to utilize this same system of control.

Asprosin was reported to stimulate glucose release from hepatocytes, and plasma levels of asprosin in obese high-fat-fed mice have been reported to nearly double. However, in a study in 2019, a pharma replication group reported their inability to replicate these two key observations using multiple forms of recombinant asprosin, suggesting that issues with reagent purity may have been responsible for the effect observed in the initial asprosin study. Nevertheless, a third group reported in 2019 that they had identified the receptor for asprosin, an olfactory receptor family GPCR expressed on liver hepatocytes, and showed that plasma asprosin levels increased with fasting and high fat diet, and that asprosin stimulated glucose release in normal mice (thereby confirming the original study) but that mice lacking this receptor were unable to respond to asprosin by releasing glucose. The liver receptor for asprosin is OR4M1. Three additional studies have since confirmed asprosin's glucogenic function.

Function in brain 
Asprosin can also exit the bloodstream and cross the blood–brain barrier to function in the brain. The first indication that asprosin was in fact a cerebrospinal fluid (CSF) protein, in addition to being a plasma protein, was the observation of asprosin in the CSF of rats at concentrations 5- to 10-fold lower than in the plasma. Additionally, intravenously introduced asprosin showed a dramatic ability to cross the blood–brain barrier and enter the CSF.

A central mechanism of appetite regulation is via orexigenic AgRP neurons and anorexigenic POMC neurons in the arcuate nucleus of the hypothalamus. Asprosin directly activates orexigenic AgRP neurons and, using the neurotransmitter GABA, indirectly inhibits anorexigenic POMC neurons.

Asprosin’s orexigenic effects are mediated through binding to protein tyrosine phosphatase receptor delta (PTPRD). Genetic ablation of PTPRD results in extreme leanness and loss of appetite. More specifically, resistance to diet-induced obesity can occur through the loss of PTPRD in AgRP neurons.  When asprosin binds to PTPRD, this leads to the de-phosphorylation and de-activation of Stat3. PTPRD is highly expressed throughout the entire brain, especially in the cerebellum and cerebellar hemisphere. PTPRD is also highly expressed in the coronary arteries, the aorta, and the ovaries.

Classification 
Asprosin is a protein hormone, but is unique in its generation as the C-terminal cleavage product of a large extracellular matrix protein. Therefore, it has been postulated to belong to a new protein hormone subclass: caudamins. It has been placed in this subclass along with the hormones: endostatin, endotrophin and placensin. Members of this class are derived from a cleavage event that also generates a much larger, functionally unrelated, nonhormonal protein. The subclass was named caudamins, from the Latin word cauda meaning 'tail'.

Clinical significance

Asprosin 
Obesity is characterized by an overall increase in adiposity and, given that asprosin is secreted by adipose tissue, it is not surprising that both obese humans and mice show pathologically elevated levels of asprosin compared with control subjects. Patients presenting with insulin resistance and obesity have elevated serum levels of asprosin, and female patients with polycystic ovary syndrome have particularly high serum levels. Obese patients undergoing bariatric surgery for weight loss show decreased asprosin levels in serum after surgery.

Asprosin-induced hyperphagia and hepatic glucose production could therefore be mechanisms that drive development of metabolic syndrome.

Fibrillin-1 
Fibrillin-1 is important for the formation of elastic fibers in connective tissues, and patients with mutations in FBN1 gene exhibit Marfan syndrome. Individuals with Marfanoid–progeroid–lipodystrophy syndrome (MPL) are deficient in asprosin due to mutations affecting the carboxy terminus of the profibrillin-1 protein and its processing into fibrillin-1 and asprosin.

Therapeutic potential 
In a test of pharmacologic asprosin depletion in animals, preliminary results raised the possibility of its use, therapeutically, in treating type 2 diabetes and obesity. For instance, Chopra and coworkers observed that when antibodies targeting asprosin were injected into diabetic mice, blood glucose and insulin levels improved.

Monoclonal anti-asprosin antibody 
Mishra and colleagues have demonstrated that anti-asprosin mAbs (monoclonal antibody) are a dual-effect therapy that targets the two key pillars of metabolic syndrome – overnutrition and plasma glucose burden . Specifically, anti-asprosin mAbs have been shown to reduce blood glucose, appetite, and body weight in various environmental and genetic models of metabolic syndrome. These findings have led to an effort to optimize and develop clinical-grade anti-asprosin mAbs for use in humans.

Asprosin has also been reported to cross the blood–brain barrier to regulate neurons in the hypothalamus of the brain known to regulate hunger and satiety, and inhibiting asprosin in obese mice reduced feeding and led to decreased body weight.

References

Further reading

External links 
 

Mammalian hormones
Peptide hormones
Obesity